Heather Williams (born 1955 in Spokane, Washington) is an American ornithologist, and professor at Williams College since 1988. She graduated from Bowdoin College with an A.B. in Biology in 1977, from Rockefeller University with a Ph.D. in Neuroscience in 1985, and was Postdoctoral fellow, Field Research Center. She was a 1993 MacArthur Fellow. Williams' most notable work highlights bird song data gathered on Kent Island also known as the "Bowdoin Science Station". In the summer of 2022, she published an article that was featured in Nature.com

Works
Behavioral neurobiology of birdsong, Editors Harris Philip Zeigler, Peter Marler, New York Academy of Sciences, 2004, 
Cumulative cultural evolution and mechanisms for cultural selection in wild bird songs, Authors: Heather Williams, Andrew Scharf, Anna R. Ryba, D. Ryan Norris, Daniel J. Mennill, Amy E. M. Newman, Stéphanie M. Doucet & Julie C. Blackwood, Nature.com, 2022, https://www.nature.com/articles/s41467-022-31621-9#citeas

External links
"Bird Song Discoveries May Lead To Refinement Of Darwinian Theory", ScienceDaily (Jan. 31, 2009) 
Essel Program, Annual Report 2002
Notable women in the life sciences: a biographical dictionary, Editors Benjamin F. Shearer, Barbara Smith Shearer, Greenwood Press, 1996, 

American ornithologists
Women ornithologists
1955 births
People from Spokane, Washington
Bowdoin College alumni
Rockefeller University alumni
Williams College faculty
MacArthur Fellows
Living people
American neuroscientists
American women neuroscientists